Saina is a 2021 Indian Hindi-language biographical sports film directed by Amole Gupte and produced by Bhushan Kumar, Krishan Kumar, Sujay Jairaj and Rashesh Shah under the banner of T-Series and Front Foot Pictures. Based on the life of badminton player Saina Nehwal, the film stars Parineeti Chopra as Nehwal. The film was initially set to release in September 2020, but was postponed due to the COVID-19 pandemic in India. It was theatrically released on 26 March 2021.

Plot 
The film traces Saina's journey from her training at Lal Bahadur Shastri Stadium, Hyderabad, her struggles, her parents sacrifices for her dreams, her passion for badminton, her relationship with Kashyap and her coach Rajan to her becoming World's No.1.

Cast 
 Parineeti Chopra as Saina Nehwal
 Manav Kaul as Coach Sarvadhamaan Rajan, a fictionalized version of Pullela Gopichand
 Eshan Naqvi as Parupalli Kashyap
 Meghna Malik as Usha Rani Nehwal, Saina's mother
 Subhrajyoti Barat  as Harvir Singh Nehwal, Saina's father
 Ankur Vikal as Coach Jeewan Kumar
 Tawhid Rike Zaman as Rohan's Friend
 Sharrman Dey as Damodar
 Sameer Bassi as Rohan
 Taiyaba Mansuri as young Abu Nehwal

Production

Development
Saina Nehwal revealing the details of the film, on her Twitter account announced the film on 26 April 2017. Earlier, Shraddha Kapoor was signed to play Nehwal's role, and she even started filming in September 2018 after training, but later she opted out of the film due to health issues. On 15 March 2019, it was confirmed by T-Series head honcho Bhushan Kumar that Shraddha Kapoor will not be playing the role of Nehwal. In a statement they said, "Due to circumstances beyond her control, the actress kept giving other films priority over the national badminton champion’s biopic, so the makers have decided to go ahead with Chopra."

In June, Manav Kaul was finalized to play the role of Pullela Gopichand who is Nehwal's coach.

Training
From mid June, Chopra was training herself in playing badminton and practicing the stances of Nehwal. As many as 12 courts were recreated to represent international venues where Saina Nehwal has played.

Reception

Box office
The film collected total  1.2 crore in its theatrical run, it was declared flop and disastrous.

It was impacted due to Covid-19.

Critical reception
Saina received mixed to positive reviews from critics with praises towards Chopra's performance. Yogesh Mishra of 'Bollywood Town' says "Movie beautifully talks about the success saga of a middle-class girl from Haryana". Shubhra Gupta of The Indian Express gave 3 out of 5 stars and noted that Parineeti "serves, drops and smashes as [the] badminton champ", writing "[Chopra] gives us a good, solid Saina Nehwal. When she raises her racket after a hard-fought win, you cheer."

Film critic Anna M. M. Vetticad applauded Chopra for rising to the challenge of playing the sports icon, writing "The actor plays down her naturally vivacious personality and sparkling eyes for the not-so-showy character she plays here. Most impressively, she gets the body language of a sportsperson right and actually looks the part on court." She gave the film 2.75 star out of 5 and pointed out that the film erases Gopichand and skirts inconvenient truths. 

Renuka Vyavahare of Times Of India gave the film 3.5 stars out of 5 and wrote, "Saina is a simple ode to eternal optimism". For Chopra's performance she said, "Parineeti push herself in this physically demanding role".

Accolades

Soundtrack 

The soundtrack is composed by Amaal Mallik, produced, arranged & co-written by Meghdeep Bose with lyrics by Manoj Muntashir and Kunaal Vermaa.

References

External links
 
 Saina on Bollywood Hungama

2020s Hindi-language films
Indian biographical films
Biographical films about sportspeople
Cultural depictions of badminton players
Cultural depictions of Indian women
T-Series (company) films
Badminton films
2020s biographical films